The 2009–10 Florida State Seminoles women's basketball team represented Florida State University in the 2009–10 NCAA Division I women's basketball season. The Seminoles were coached by Sue Semrau. The Seminoles were a member of the Atlantic Coast Conference.

The Seminoles won their second consecutive regular season title and were selected as a three-seed in the NCAA tournament where they advanced to the semifinals for the first time in school history

Offseason
May 5:The Florida State women's basketball team will play at the Indiana University as part of the 2009 Big Ten/ACC Women's Basketball Challenge. The two squads will square off on Dec. 3, 2009.
May 6:The 2009 USA Women's World University Games Team Trials roster was officially released Thursday and Florida State standout Jacinta Monroe is one of 29 players that are set to compete for one of 12 spots on the final roster.
May 13:Florida State University women's basketball coach Sue Semrau and men's basketball coach Leonard Hamilton were recognized by the Florida State Senate on April 23 for their accomplishments.
July 30: The Women's Basketball Coaches Association (WBCA), on behalf of the Wade Coalition, announced the 2009–2010 preseason "Wade Watch" list for The State Farm Wade Trophy Division I Player of the Year. Florida State’s Jacinta Monroe has been named to the 2009–10 preseason "Wade Watch" list, which is made up of top NCAA Division I student-athletes who best embody the spirit of Lily Margaret Wade. This is based on the following criteria: game and season statistics, leadership, character, effect on their team and overall playing ability.
August 21: The 2009–10 preseason candidates list for the Women’s Wooden Award was released, naming 31 student athletes. Jacinta Monroe from Florida State was one of the candidates.

Regular season

Roster

Schedule

Player stats

Postseason

NCAA basketball tournament

Team players drafted into the WNBA

See also
2009–10 ACC women’s basketball season
List of Atlantic Coast Conference women's basketball regular season champions
List of Atlantic Coast Conference women's basketball tournament champions

References

External links
Official Site

Florida State Seminoles women's basketball
Florida State
Florida State
Florida State Seminoles women's basketball seasons